David Holderbach (born 19 February 1971) is a French former backstroke swimmer. He competed at the 1988 Summer Olympics and the 1992 Summer Olympics.

References

External links
 

1971 births
Living people
French male backstroke swimmers
Olympic swimmers of France
Swimmers at the 1988 Summer Olympics
Swimmers at the 1992 Summer Olympics
Sportspeople from Valence, Drôme
20th-century French people